Belchior may refer to:

Belchior (singer) (1946–2017), Brazilian singer
Belchior (footballer) (born 1982), Portuguese footballer